Eschata shanghaiensis is a moth in the family Crambidae. It was described by Wang and Sung in 1981. It is found in China.

References

Chiloini
Moths described in 1981